Flualprazolam is a tranquilizer of the triazolobenzodiazepine (TBZD) class, which are benzodiazepines (BZDs) fused with a triazole ring. It was first synthesised in 1976, but was never marketed. It can be seen as the triazolo version of fludiazepam. It has subsequently been sold as a designer drug, first being definitively identified as such in Sweden in 2018. It can be described as the 2'-fluoro derivative of alprazolam or the fluoro instead of chloro analogue of triazolam, and has similar sedative and anxiolytic effects.

Legal status 

Flualprazolam is banned in Sweden, also is illegal in the UK. In December 2019, the World Health Organization recommended flualprazolam for international scheduling as a Schedule IV medication under the Convention on Psychotropic Substances. The substance is illegal in Oregon.

See also 
 Clobromazolam
 Fluadinazolam
 Fluclotizolam
 Fludiazepam
 Flubromazolam
 Pyrazolam
 Flurazepam
 Triazolam
 Clonazolam
 Etizolam
 Phenazepam
 Nitrazolam

References 

Designer drugs
Fluoroarenes
GABAA receptor positive allosteric modulators
Triazolobenzodiazepines
Substances discovered in the 1970s